I'm John Lee Hooker is an album by blues musician John Lee Hooker, compiling seven tracks originally released as singles between 1955 and 1958 along with five new tracks recorded in 1959, that was released by the Vee-Jay label.

Reception

The Penguin Guide to Blues Recordings wrote: "When Hooker's Vee-Jay sides first appeared, as singles, they were heartening indications that honest and ungimmicky blues were still being made ... Taken at a draught, decades later they are a little less compelling. Putting Hooker with an efficient band was presumably intended to relieve him of rhythmic chores and give him room to flex vocal or instrumental muscle, but he gains little from it; he is always his most interesting rhythm provider."

AllMusic reviewer Lindsay Planer stated: "I'm John Lee Hooker was first issued in 1959 during his tenure with Vee Jay and is "the Hook" in his element as well as prime. ... Time has, if anything, only reinforced the significance of the album. It belongs in every blues enthusiast's collection without reservation."

Track listing
All compositions credited to John Lee Hooker
 "Dimples" – 2:14
 "Hobo Blues" – 2:48
 "I'm So Excited" – 2:53
 "I Love You Honey" – 2:33
 "Boogie Chillun" – 2:35
 "Little Wheel" – 2:34
 "I'm in the Mood" – 2:42
 "Maudie" – 2:17
 "Crawlin' King Snake" – 2:41
 "Everynight" – 2:58
 "Time Is Marching" – 3:01
 "Baby Lee" – 2:48
Recorded in Chicago on October 19, 1955 (track 11), March 27, 1956 (tracks 1, 10 & 12), March 1, 1957 (track 3), June 23, 1957 (track 6), June 10, 1958 (track 4) and January 22, 1959 (tracks 2, 5 & 7-9)

Personnel
John Lee Hooker – guitar, vocals
Jimmy Reed – harmonica (track 11)
Eddie Taylor – guitar (tracks 1, 3, 6-8 & 10-12)
Frankie Bradford (track 6), Joe Hunter (track 4) – piano 
Everett McCrary (tracks 4 & 6), George Washington (track 1 & 10-12), Quinn Wilson (track 3) – bass 
Richard Johnson (tracks 4 & 6), Earl Phillips (track 7), Tom Whitehead (tracks 1, 3 & 10-12) – drums

References

John Lee Hooker albums
1959 albums
Vee-Jay Records albums